Marc López and Simone Vagnozzi were the defending champions, but none competed this year.

Nicolás Lapentti and Eduardo Schwank won the title by defeating Sebastián Decoud and Cristian Villagrán 6–4, 6–0 in the final.

Seeds

Draw

Draw

References

External links
 Main Draw (ATP)
 ITF tournament profile

La Serena